Svyaznoy is Russia's second-largest independent handset retailer, with over 2,900 stores in Russia and Belarus. Its founder and owner is Maksim Nogotkov. As of 2009, the company controls 22,4% of the Russian mobile retail market. Its main rival is Euroset, which Svyaznoy later acquired.

The company was known as Maxus between 1995 and 2002. As of July 2013, Svyaznoy was the only official reseller of iPhones in Russia. Since 2010 Nogotkov has also been developing a banking chain, Svyaznoy Bank.

Svyaznoy company claimed to start bankutcy process at February 2023. After the start of the military operation in Ukraine, a number of equipment manufacturers stopped deliveries to Russia.

References 

Telecommunications companies of Russia
Retail companies of Russia
Retail companies established in 1995
Companies based in Moscow